Halstead and Emily Lindsley House is a national historic site located at 1300 West 13th Street, Boca Grande, Florida in Lee County. Built in Mediterranean Revival, it was designed by F. Burrall Hoffman, who also designed Villa Vizcaya.

It was added to the National Register of Historic Places in 2011.

References

National Register of Historic Places in Lee County, Florida
Gasparilla Island